is a Japanese professional footballer who plays as a defender for Giravanz Kitakyushu.

References

External links

1996 births
Living people
Japanese footballers
Association football defenders
Giravanz Kitakyushu players
J2 League players
J3 League players